The United Nations Educational, Scientific and Cultural Organization (UNESCO) designates World Heritage Sites of outstanding universal value to cultural or natural heritage which  have been nominated by countries which are signatories to the UNESCO World Heritage Convention, established in 1972. Cultural heritage consists of monuments (such as architectural works, monumental sculptures, or inscriptions), groups of buildings, and sites (including archaeological sites). Natural features (consisting of physical and biological formations), geological and physiographical formations (including habitats of threatened species of animals and plants), and natural sites which are important from the point of view of science, conservation or natural beauty, are defined as natural heritage. Kazakhstan accepted the convention on 29 April 1994.

, there are five World Heritage Sites listed in Kazakhstan, with a further 14 on the tentative list. The first site inscribed to the list was the Mausoleum of Khoja Ahmed Yasawi, at the 27th Session of the World Heritage Committee, held in Paris in 2003. The most recent sites listed were two transnational sites: Silk Roads: the Routes Network of Chang'an-Tianshan Corridor, listed in 2014, is shared with China and Kyrgyzstan, while Western Tien-Shan, shared with Kyrgyzstan and Uzbekistan, was listed in 2016. Three sites are cultural while Saryarka – Steppe and Lakes of Northern Kazakhstan and Tien-Shan are natural.

World Heritage Sites 
UNESCO lists sites under ten criteria; each entry must meet at least one of the criteria. Criteria i through vi are cultural, and vii through x are natural.

Tentative list
In addition to sites inscribed on the World Heritage List, member states can maintain a list of tentative sites that they may consider for nomination. Nominations for the World Heritage List are only accepted if the site was previously listed on the tentative list. , Kazakhstan lists 14 properties on its tentative list.

References

Kazakhstan geography-related lists
Kazakhstan
 List
Lists of tourist attractions in Kazakhstan